Francesco Solimena (4 October 1657 – 3 April 1747) was a prolific Italian painter of the Baroque era, one of an established family of painters and draughtsmen.

Biography

Francesco Solimena was born in Canale di Serino in the province of Avellino.

He received early training from his father, Angelo Solimena, with whom he executed a Paradise for the cathedral of Nocera (a place where he spent a big part of his life) and a Vision of St. Cyril of Alexandria for the church of San Domenico at Solofra.

He settled in Naples in 1674, where he worked in the studio of Francesco di Maria. He was patronized early on, and encouraged to become an artist by Cardinal Vincenzo Orsini (later Pope Benedict XIII). By the 1680s, he had independent fresco commissions, and his active studio came to dominate Neapolitan painting from the 1690s through the first four decades of the 18th century.  He modeled his art—for he was a highly conventional painter—after the Roman Baroque masters, Luca Giordano and Giovanni Lanfranco, and Mattia Preti, whose technique of warm brownish shadowing Solimena emulated.  Solimena painted many frescoes in Naples, altarpieces, celebrations of weddings and courtly occasions, mythological subjects, characteristically chosen for their theatrical drama, and portraits. His settings are suggested with a few details—steps, archways, balustrades, columns—concentrating attention on figures and their draperies, caught in pools and shafts of light. Art historians take pleasure in identifying the models he imitated or adapted in his compositions. His numerous preparatory drawings often mix media, combining pen and ink, chalk, and watercolor washes.

A typical example of the elaborately constructed allegorical "machines" of his early mature style, fully employing his mastery of chiaroscuro, is the Allegory of Rule (1690) from the Stroganoff collection, which has come to the State Hermitage Museum, St Petersburg.

Francesco Solimena amassed a fortune and lived in sumptuous style founded on his success. He died at Barra, near Naples, in 1747 at the age of 89.

As Solimena had intended it, his nephew Orazio became his pupil and successor as a painter.

Career

His large, efficiently structured atelier became a virtual academy, at the heart of cultural life in Naples. Among his many pupils were Giuseppe Bonito (1707–89), Domenico Antonio Vaccaro (1678-1745), Nicola Maria Rossi, Lorenzo De Caro, Jacopo Cestaro, Andrea dell'Asta, Paolo De Majo, Ludovico De Majo, Pietro Capelli, Domenico Mondo, Onofrio Avellino, Scipione Cappella, Giovanni della Camera, Francesco Campora, Alessandro Guglielmi, Leonardo Oliviero, Salvatore Olivieri, Salvatore Pace, Romualdo Polverino, Paolo Gamba, Bernardino Fera, Evangelista Schiano, Gaspare Traversi, Francesco Narici, Alessio D'Elia, Santolo Cirillo, Michele Foschini, Tommaso Martini, Alfonso Di Spigna, Michelangelo Schilles, Giovanni Battista Vela, Ferrante Amendola, Eugenio Vegliante, Romualdo Formosa, and most notably Corrado Giaquinto, Francesco De Mura and Sebastiano Conca. The Scottish portraitist Allan Ramsay spent three years in Solimena's studio.

References

External links

 Francesco Solimena on-line
 J. Paul Getty Museum: Francesco Solimena
 Scuola Media F. Solimena, Canale di Serino.
 
 

1657 births
1747 deaths
People from the Province of Avellino
17th-century Italian painters
Italian male painters
18th-century Italian painters
Painters from Naples
Italian Baroque painters
Rococo architects
18th-century Italian male artists